This list contains the names of significant contributors to the history and development of the scale-model and model-kit industry, including engineers, artists, designers, draftsmen, tool-makers, executives, historians and promoters.

This list does not include people primarily notable for the competitive operation of a scale-model vehicle, unless they have a notable career as designers or executives or outside of the hobby industry such as car designers.

A

 Steve Adams: founder of Adams Models
 Harold Alden: early aircraft modeler and industry promoter
 John Allen: influential model railroader 
 John Amendola: kit-box artist
 Mel Anderson: gas engine designer (for flying scale aircraft) 
 John Andrews: artist, kit designer and marketer for Hawk
 Ray Arden: inventor of the Glo-Plug
 William Atwood: engine designer (for flying scale aircraft)

B

 Charlie Bauer: flying aircraft kit designer 
 Adrien Bertin: R/C car glowplug engine designer 
 Edward Beshar: early model designer and builder  
 Jack Besser: co-founder of Monogram Models
 Maxwell Basset: gas-powered model pioneer 
 Pieter Bervoets: co-founder of Serpent
 Dick Branstner: co-founder of MPC, kit designer, creator of the 'Color Me Gone' dragsters
 William Brown IV: created first successful gas engine for mass-marketed flying aircraft

C

 Bill Campbell: illustrator, kit-box art designer/painter; creator of the Weird-Ohs and Silly Surfers series for Hawk
 Tom Carter: industry executive
 Bill Coulter: writer; builder; kit-developer 
 James "Jim" Petit Cox (1910-1993): illustrator, kit-box art designer/painter. Notably associated with Aurora
 John Cuomo (1901-1971): first salesman for Aurora
 Bill Cushenbery: custom kit designer, notably associated with AMT
 Roger Curtis: Co-founder of Associated Electrics and R/C car designer (RC10, RC12)

D

 Tom Daniel: kit-designer of custom and caricature subjects for Monogram Models 
 Bruce Devlin: Laboratory Manager of wind tunnel testing and engineering flow modeling company Airflow Sciences Corporation

E

 Billy Easton: R/C car designer for Serpent (and previously Team Durango)
 Scott Eidson: kit-box artist
 Fred Ertl, Sr.: founder of the Ertl Company

F
 Jacque Fresco (1916–): co-founder of Revell

G

 West Gallogly: founder of AMT
 Lorenzo Ghiglieri: kit-box artist
 Joseph E. Giammarino (1916–1992): co-founder of Aurora Plastics Corporation
 "Dirty Donny" Gillies: kit-box artist
 Lewis H. Glaser (1917-1972): co-founder of Revell
 Walt Good: considered "the father of remote-control aircraft modeling"
 Carl Goldberg: model aircraft designer and industry executive
 Kevin Gowland, John Gowland and Jack Gowland: co-founders of Gowland and Gowland; the company's Highway Pioneers line of early car model kits was marketed by Revell in the early '50s, and was instrumental in the early growth of the scale model hobby in the US.
 Paul K. Guillows: founder of GHQ Model Airplane Company (later known as Guillows) 
 Leonardo Garofali: co-founder of SG Racing Cars and Blitz Model Technica
 Jaures Garofali: founder of Super Tigre Saturno micromecanica

H

 Scott T. Hards: entrepreneur, founder of Hobby Link Japan
 John Hanley: tool and die maker; founder of Jo-Han
 Suguro Hasegawa: founder of Hasegawa Corporation
 Roger Harney: industry executive 
 Don Holthaus: founder of Modelhaus
 Juraj Hudy: founder of XRAY and Hudy
 Gene Husting (1927-2014): executive of Associated Electrics

I
 Takashi Ishii, founder/owner of Studio 27/Gilles Company

J

 Dean Jeffries: kit designer, auto customizer, notably associated with MPC
 Bob Johnson: industry executive

K

 Al Kalmbach: founder of Model Railroader magazine and Kalmbach Publishing, early industry promoter
 Yuichi Kanai: radio-controlled car designer, significantly for Kyosho (Inferno)
 Shigeru Kawada: radio-controlled car designer and founder-owner of Kawada Model
 Jim Keeler: industry executive
 Levon Kemalyan (1907–1976): manufacturer, founder of Kemtron
 Richard Kishady: kit-box artist
 Akira Kogawa: radio-controlled car designer, significantly for Kyosho (Optima, Scorpion) and Hobby Products International (Baja 5B and 5T)
 Shigeru Komatsuzaki: science-fiction illustrator; kit-box artist 
 Jo Kotula: aviation illustrator; kit-box artist 
 Dick Korda: award-winning model airplane designer and flyer
 Nicholas Kove (1891-1958): founder of Airfix
 Oscar Koveleski: CanAm racing pioneer; founder of Auto World; promoter of slot car racing, model building, and RC racing and building
 Mort Künstler: kit-box artist, notably associated with Aurora in the 1960s.

L
 Jürgen Lautenbach: founder of LRP Electronic
 Cliff Lett: R/C car designer and president of Associated Electrics
 William M. "Bill" Lester (1908-2005): founder of Pyro Plastics Corporation, pioneer in the development of injection molding
 Paul Lindberg: founder of Lindberg Products, Inc.
 William, Walter and Arthur Lines: co-founders of Frog
 Dick Locher: kit-box artist
 Ted Longshaw (1926-2011): hobby shop owner and founder of BRCA, EFRA and IFMAR 
 Gil Losi: founder of Losi, former owner of Ranch Pit Shop

M

 Joe Mansour: co-founder of Frog 
 Tom Marshall: founder of Buggleskelly Station 
 Dick Mates Sr. and Phil Mates (brothers): co-founders of Hawk Model Company
 Dick Mates Jr.: executive at Hawk
 Bob McCleod: industry executive
 Fred Megow: founder of Megow Models (Philadelphia, 1920s)
 Tom Morgan: kit-box artist, most notably associated with Hawk in the 1960s, as well as Monogram
 Robert Mudry: President of wind tunnel testing and engineering flow modeling company Airflow Sciences Corporation
 John Mueller: directed product and mold design and technical illustration groups for AMT

N
Philippe Neidhart: founder of Team Orion, CEO of Neidhart SA
Kody Numedahl: radio-controlled car designer for Team Associated

O
 Jack Odell: co-founder of Lesney Products and founder of Lledo
 Irwin G. Ohlsson: gas engine designer and manufacturer (flying model aircraft)

P
 Keith Plested: founder of PB Racing and co-founder of BRCA
 Irwin S. Polk and Nathan J. Polk: owners of Polk Hobbies; promoters of the scale model hobby
 Ernest Provetti: founder of Trinity Products
Tarquinio Provini: founder of Protar

Q
 Joseph Quagraine: designer/founder of JQ Products

R

 Bob Reder: co-founder of Monogram Models
 Mike Reedy (1941 - 2011): founder of Reedy and creator of Reedy International Race of Champions
 F. Lee Renaud (-1983): founder of Airtronics
 Bob Rule (businessman), founder of BoLink

S
 Franco Sabatini: designer and co-founder of SG Racing Cars
 Michael Salven: executive of Serpent, designer (Impact, Vector)
 Koji Sanada: R/C car designer, president and CEO of Mugen Seiki, formerly of Aoyagi Metals Company
 Pierre Scerri: model engineer
 Gary Schmidt: industry executive
 Cyril Schumacher: founder of Schumacher Racing Products
 Leon Shulman: aircraft kit designer
 Abe Shikes (1908–1997): co-founder of Aurora Plastics Corporation
 George Siposs (1931-1995): radio controlled car racing pioneer and founder of ROAR
 Victor Stanzel: flying aircraft model designer
 James Hay Stevens (1913 -1973): aircraft kit designer, notably associated with Airfix
 John Steel: kit-box artist
 Henry Struck: aircraft kit designer
 Hisashi Suzuki (1936-2010): radio controlled car racing pioneer (in Japan), founder of Kyosho and JMRCA
 Masayuki Suzuki: former president of Kyosho

T

Fumito Taki: radio-controlled car designer, significantly for Tamiya (famous works: Sand Scorcher)
 Yoshio Tamiya (1905 - 1988): founder of Tamiya
 Masayuki Tamiya (c1957/1958 - 2017): president of Tamiya
 Shunsaku Tamiya: chairman of Tamiya
 Nils F. Testor: founder of Testors
 George A. Toteff Jr. (1925-2011): founder of MPC, inventor of the AMT 3-in-1 kit; innovator of one-piece body car-model tooling.

U
Yukijiro Umino: designer for Yokomo (Yokomo MR4TC BDx)

V

 Dave Vander Wal: industry executive
 Gordon Varney: founder of Varney Scale Models, developer of early injection molded plastic kits
 Norm Veber: industry executive
 Peter Vetri: Founder and President of Atlantis Toy and Hobby and Current President of the HMA (Hobby Manufacturers Association)

W
 Jim Walker: inventor of U-Control Line Flying (scale aircraft)
 Jairus Watson: graphic designer, automotive conceptual artist, kit-box illustrator.
 Dick Wellman: kit-box artist
 Patrick Wentzel: Co-Founder of Carousel Modelers and Miniatures Association
 Tom West: industry executive
 Linn H. Westcott: long-time editor of Model Railroader, hobby industry promoter
 Charles Wilmot: co-founder of Frog
 John Wilmot: co-founder of Frog, pioneer of plastic scale kit models
 Gerald Wingrove: model engineer

X

Y
Tomoaki "Tom" Yokobori: founder of Yokomo and Yatabe Arena

Z

References

Notes

Bibliography

External links
 Hobby Manufacturers Association (HMA); https://www.hmahobby.org
 Plastics Academy Hall of Fame; https://archive.today/20130705001947/http://www.plasticsacademy.org/swp/articles.php?articleId=89

Scale modeling
Model aircraft
Model boats